Aav is an Estonian surname. Notable people with the surname include:

 Evald Aav (1900–1939), Estonian composer
 Herman Aav (1878–1961), Estonian Orthodox archbishop
 Tõnu Aav (1939–2019), Estonian stage, TV, film, and radio actor

Estonian-language surnames